Shinichi Hoshi (星 新一 Hoshi Shin'ichi, September 6, 1926 – December 30, 1997) was a Japanese novelist and science fiction writer best known for his "short-short" science fiction stories, often no more than three or four pages in length, of which he wrote over 1000. He also wrote mysteries and won the Mystery Writers of Japan Award for Mōsō Ginkō (Delusion Bank) in 1968.

One of his short stories, "Bokko-chan" ("Miss Bokko"), was translated into English and published in Magazine of Fantasy and Science Fiction in June 1963. His books translated into English include There Was a Knock, a collection of 15 stories, and The Spiteful Planet and Other Stories.

His friend Osamu Tezuka used his name for a character in Amazing 3, a manga and anime series which Tezuka produced in 1967.

His grandmother on his mother's side, Kimiko Koganei, was the sister of Mori Ōgai.

Bibliography 
 Miss Bokko (Bokko-chan), Shinchosha Publishing Co. Ltd., 1963.
 The Spiteful Planet and Other Stories, Japan Times, 1978.
 There Was a Knock, Kodansha, 1984.  
 The Capricious Robot, Kodansha International, 1986.  
 The Bag of Surprises, Kodansha International, 1989. 
 The Whimsical Robot (Kimagure Robotto), Kadokawa Shoten
 Aesop Fables for the Future (Mirai Issoppu), Shinchosha Publishing Co. Ltd.
 Heaven with a Demon (Akuma no iru Tengoku), Shinchosha Publishing Co. Ltd.
 Inconsistent Parts (Chiguhaguna Buhin), Shinchosha Publishing Co. Ltd.
 Welcome, Earth! (Yokoso Chikyu-san) Shinchosha Publishing Co. Ltd.
 Meddlesome Gods (Osekkaina Kamigami), Shinchosha Publishing Co. Ltd.
 The Ending You Wished For (Onozomino Ketsumatsu), Shinchosha Publishing Co. Ltd.
 Bonbons and Nightmares (Bonbon to Akumu), Shinchosha Publishing Co. Ltd.
 Greetings from Outer Space (Uchu no Aisatsu), Shinchosha Publishing Co. Ltd.
 The Other Side of the Swing (Buranko no Mukode), Shinchosha Publishing Co. Ltd.
 The Modern Adventures of Baron Munchausen (Hora Danshaku Gendai no Boken)
 The Fairy Distributing Company (Yosei Haikyu Gaisha)
 My Nation (Mai Kokka)
 A Handful of Future (Hitonigiri no Mirai)

External links 
 The Hoshi Library The Official English Website of Shinichi Hoshi 
 Life & Works 
 SF Writers of Japan bio 
  
 J'Lit | Authors : Shin'ichi Hoshi | Books from Japan 

1926 births
1997 deaths
Writers from Tokyo
Japanese illustrators
20th-century Japanese novelists
Japanese science fiction writers
Japanese male short story writers
Mystery Writers of Japan Award winners
University of Tokyo alumni
20th-century Japanese short story writers
20th-century Japanese male writers